Bhagipur may refer to:

Bhagipur - a village in Raebareli district in Uttar Pradesh, India.
Bhagipur- a village in Shitalpur Tehsil, Etah District, Uttar Pradesh, India.